Wiltshirocossus aries is a species of moth of the family Cossidae. It is found in southern Spain, on the Canary Islands, as well as in Mauritania, Israel, Saudi Arabia, Bahrain, the United Arab Emirates, Yemen, Oman, Algeria, Tunisia and Egypt. The habitat consists of deserts and semidesert areas.

The wingspan is about 39 mm. The ground colour of the forewings is white, with brownish suffusion. The hindwings are shining greyish black.
Adults are on wing from February to April in North Africa and from April to May in Spain.

The larvae feed on Acacia species.

Subspecies
Wiltshirocossus aries aries
Wiltshirocossus aries aegyptiaca (Hampson, 1910) (Egypt)
Wiltshirocossus aries cheesmani (Tams, 1925) (Saudi Arabia, Bahrain)

References

Moths described in 1902
Cossinae
Moths of Europe
Moths of Asia
Moths of Africa